uShaka Marine World is a  theme park that opened on 30 April 2004 in Durban, KwaZulu-Natal, South Africa. It has a total capacity of 4.6 million gallons containing 10,000 animal species.

History

Designed by American firm Creative Kingdom Inc. Shaka Marine World opened on 30 April 2004 after 3 years of development. In 2005, the park was awarded for "Outstanding Achievement in thematic creative design" by the Themed Entertainment Association.

uShaka Wet 'n Wild 

uShaka Wet 'n Wild is a water park inside uShaka Marine World.

uShaka Beach 

uShaka Beach is a beach which has direct access from the amusement park. It has sand beaches and a large pier leading out into the ocean.

uShaka Village Walk 
uShaka Village Walk is designed similar to an African village, and includes restaurants, cafes and numerous shops.

uShaka Dangerous Creatures 

Dangerous Creatures is an adventure for reptile enthusiasts and adrenaline junkies.

Chimp and Zee 
Chimp & Zee has the longest continuous belay system in Africa, and is a rope adventure park.

Financial troubles

The park was built at a cost of ZAR 700-million and has been subsidized for a total of ZAR 450-million by the eThekwini Municipality. In the 2009–2010 financial year, the park suffered a net loss of ZAR 44.5-million, and a total deficit of ZAR 377.5-million. There were also irregular expenditures (expenditures which did not undergo normal procurement procedures) of ZAR 3.15-million on the park.

References

Amusement parks in South Africa
Aquaria in South Africa
Buildings and structures in Durban
Tourist attractions in Durban
2004 establishments in South Africa